Croatia is scheduled to compete at the 2017 World Aquatics Championships in Budapest, Hungary from 14 July to 30 July.

Medalists

Diving

Croatia has entered 2 divers (one male and one female).

Open water swimming

Croatia has entered one open water swimmer

Swimming

Croatian swimmers have achieved qualifying standards in the following events (up to a maximum of 2 swimmers in each event at the A-standard entry time, and 1 at the B-standard):

Synchronized swimming

Croatia's synchronized swimming team consisted of 10 athletes (10 female).

Women

 Legend: (R) = Reserve Athlete

Water polo

Croatia qualified a men's team.

Men's tournament

Team roster

Marko Bijač
Marko Macan
Loren Fatović
Luka Lončar
Maro Joković
Ivan Buljubašić
Ante Vukičević
Andro Bušlje
Sandro Sukno (C)
Ivan Krapić
Anđelo Šetka
Xavier García
Ivan Marcelić

Group play

Quarterfinals

Semifinals

Final

References

Nations at the 2017 World Aquatics Championships
Croatia at the World Aquatics Championships
2017 in Croatian sport